The Glacier Basin Campground Ranger Station in Rocky Mountain National Park was built in 1930 to a design by the National Park Service Branch of Plans and Designs.  The National Park Service Rustic log and stone structure was designed to blend with the landscape, and continues to function as a ranger station.

See also
National Register of Historic Places listings in Larimer County, Colorado

References

Park buildings and structures on the National Register of Historic Places in Colorado
Government buildings completed in 1930
National Register of Historic Places in Rocky Mountain National Park
Buildings and structures in Larimer County, Colorado
National Park Service ranger stations
National Register of Historic Places in Larimer County, Colorado
1930 establishments in Colorado
National Park Service rustic in Colorado